A chemical transport model (CTM) is a type of computer numerical model which typically simulates atmospheric chemistry and may give air pollution forecasting.

Chemical transport models and general circulation models 

While related general circulation models (GCMs) focus on simulating overall atmospheric dynamics (e.g. fluid and heat flows), a CTM instead focuses on the stocks and flows of one or more chemical species. Similarly, a CTM must solve only the continuity equation for its species of interest, a GCM must solve all the primitive equations for the atmosphere; but a CTM will be expected to accurately represent the entire cycle for the species of interest, including fluxes (e.g. advection), chemical production/loss, and deposition. That being said, the tendency, especially as the cost of computing declines over time, is for GCMs to incorporate CTMs for species of special interest to climate dynamics, especially shorter-lived species such as nitrogen oxides and volatile organic compounds; this allows feedbacks from the CTM to the GCM's radiation calculations, and also allows the meteorological fields forcing the CTM to be updated at higher time resolution than may be practical in studies with offline CTMs.

Types of chemical transport models 
CTMs may be classified according to their methodology and their species of interest, as well as more generic characteristics (e.g. dimensionality, degree of resolution).

Methodologies 
Jacob (1999) classifies CTMs as Eulerian/"box" or Lagrangian/"puff" models, depending on whether the CTM in question focuses on

 (Eulerian) "boxes" through which fluxes, and in which chemical production/loss and deposition occur over time
 (Lagrangian) the production and motion of parcels of air ("puffs") over time

An Eulerian CTM solves its continuity equations using a global/fixed frame of reference, while a Lagrangian CTM uses a local/moving frame of reference.

See also 
 discussion of gridding in CLaMS
 Lagrangian and Eulerian coordinates
 discussion of the continuity equation in Jacob's Introduction to Atmospheric Chemistry online

Examples of Eulerian CTMs 
 CCATT-BRAMS
 WRF-Chem
 CMAQ, CMAQ Website
 CAMx
 GEOS-Chem
 LOTOS-EUROS
 MATCH
 MOZART: (Model for OZone And Related chemical Tracers) is developed jointly by the (US) National Center for Atmospheric Research (NCAR), the Geophysical Fluid Dynamics Laboratory (GFDL), and the Max Planck Institute for Meteorology (MPI-Met) to simulate changes in ozone concentrations in the Earth's atmosphere. MOZART was designed to simulate tropospheric chemical and transport processes, but has been extended (MOZART3) into the stratosphere and mesosphere. It can be driven by standard meteorological fields from, for example,the National Centers for Environmental Prediction (NCEP), the European Centre for Medium-Range Weather Forecasts (ECMWF) and the Global Modeling and Assimilation Office (GMAO), or by fields generated from general circulation models. MOZART4 improves MOZART2's chemical mechanisms, photolysis scheme, dry deposition mechanism, biogenic emissions and handling of tropospheric aerosols.
 TOMCAT/SLIMCAT
 CHIMERE
 POLYPHEMUS
 TCAM (Transport Chemical Aerosol Model; TCAM): a mathematical modelling method (computer simulation) designed to model certain aspects of the Earth's atmosphere. TCAM is one of several chemical transport models, all of which are concerned with the movement of chemicals in the atmosphere, and are thus used in the study of air pollution.

TCAM is a multiphase three-dimensional eulerian grid model (as opposed to lagrangian or other modeling methods). It is designed for modelling dispersion of pollutants (in particular photochemical and aerosol) at mesoscales (medium scale, generally concerned with systems a few hundred kilometers in size).

TCAM was developed at the University of Brescia in Italy.

Examples of Lagrangian CTMs 
 CLaMS
 FLEXPART

Examples of Semi-Lagrangian CTMs 
 MOCAGE
 GEM-MACH

Examples of ozone CTMs 
 CLaMS
 MOZART

Notes

External links

MOZART:
UCAR's MOZART page
MPI-Met's MOZART page
Larry Horowitz's MOZART page

See also
Atmospheric dispersion modeling
List of atmospheric dispersion models
University Corporation for Atmospheric Research
National Center for Atmospheric Research
Ozone depletion
Meteorology

Numerical climate and weather models
Atmospheric dispersion modeling
Transport phenomena